The Morning Star rebellion (Swedish: Morgonstjärneupproret) was a peasant rebellion which took place in the Swedish province of Närke in 1653. It was called "Morning Star rebellion" because of the mace, commonly called "morning star", which was used by the leader of the rebels as a royal scepter. 

The situation in Sweden had been a bit tense in the countryside in 1650, when the peasantry had protested and boycotted the law that required those living on the land of a noble family to serve in their land, protests which were however successful, as Queen Christina had this duty limited by law. Nonetheless, it created some tension. 

The rebellion started in Närke in February 1653 as a protest against prescriptions of soldiers and hard taxation during a famine. Messengers calling for rebellion were passed among the peasantry and the rebels armed themselves and elected their leader as king and a maid as queen in the "Peasant Kingdom" they aspired to create. Under the leadership of a former soldier, the rebels traveled around requiting more peasant soldiers from adjoining parishes with the plan to eventually spread through the nation. 

A noblewoman who traveled through the area wrote to her son that a member of the peasantry estate in the Riksdag of the Estates had told some of her staff: "What the peasants had in mind, that they wished to kill the nobility. Which is why I ask in the name of the death God has suffered, not to show yourself there... I do not know how I will travel up there, because they say they are as crazy in Småland..."

However, the rebels did not manage to secure support from the majority of the peasantry and find recruits sufficient to stand against the royal army commanded against them by Queen Christina. The wealthier farmers refused to join, and many of the men who were requited only did so because they were threatened. The rebel army mainly traveled around in fruitless attempts to secure support and make recruits, and when the royal troops arrived, they initially managed to avoid them. Without support from the population, the rebels could not defeat the army and were soon betrayed and captured by the royal troops. 

Some rebels, notably Anders Månsson i Holmen and Henrik Matsson i Gryten, were killed on the spot. The "king" and the military commander of the rebels, Olof Mårtensson and Nils Mårtensson, were taken to the capital of Stockholm and executed by breaking wheel in April 1653. The leader posing as a monarch had a crown of heated iron pressed over his head and his arms, legs and spin crushed by the mace he used as a scepter.

References

 Ambrius Jonny, Att dömas till döden, Strömbergs förlag, 1996
 Englund, Peter, Ofredsår: om den svenska stormaktstiden och en man i dess mitt, 2. uppl., Atlantis, Stockholm, 1994, p. 517-18

Conflicts in 1653
17th century in Sweden
Rebellions in Sweden
17th-century rebellions
Peasant revolts
Christina, Queen of Sweden